Denny Island is a small uninhabited rocky island of , with scrub vegetation, in the Severn Estuary. Its rocky southern foreshore marks the boundary between England and Wales. Above high water mark, the island is reckoned administratively to Monmouthshire, South Wales. The island also marks the north-western limit of the City of Bristol's water boundary in the Severn estuary.

It is located approximately three miles north of Portishead, midway between Redwick in Wales and Avonmouth in England. It is surrounded by sandbanks known as the Welsh Grounds.  Its foreshore area changes dramatically according to the state of the tide, because tides in the estuary and Bristol Channel are amongst the highest in the world, reaching  at the spring equinox.  It is known as a nesting-place for gulls, cormorants and other seabirds, which are regularly seen and ringed there.

History 

Denny Island appears in the historical record for the first time as Dunye, in the charter recording the creation of the county of Bristol in 1373. 
This suggests that the name means, in Old English, 'island shaped like a down (i.e. a hill with a rounded profile)'.
It gives its name to the Denny Island Fault Zone, a part of the Avon-Solent Fracture zone.

In 2004, the island was subject to an unsuccessful appeal under Section 6(1) of the Countryside and Rights of Way Act 2000 against it appearing on a map of registered common land.

References

External links 
Images of Denny Island from www.geograph.co.uk

Islands of the Bristol Channel
Uninhabited islands of Wales
Islands of Monmouthshire
Islands of the River Severn
River islands of Wales